The Edgartown School is located on Martha's Vineyard, Massachusetts.  Current enrollment stands at about 348. The school mascot is the Eagle. 

This school has a well-developed enrichment program which includes NAL, The math program "EPGY", Edgartown readers, KMO, etc. and mock trial. In February 2006 the boys' varsity basketball team won the island championship. In 2008 the girls' softball team won the island championship.

The school recently built a new building, replacing the old red brick one of 50 years. The two school buildings are connected by the gym. The basketball team of 2008 came in second place. The volleyball team came in first place in 2008. In 2012, the lady's basketball team claimed first place. Also, in 2013 both the girls' and the boys' basketball teams won first place in the tough championships.
2013:
Edgartown Boys vs Charter Boys.
In 2014 the boys' basketball team came up just short in a final against Tisbury by a score of 47-33

External links
 Official site

Buildings and structures in Edgartown, Massachusetts
Martha's Vineyard
Schools in Dukes County, Massachusetts